Tapinoma pygmaeum is a species of ant in the genus Tapinoma. Described by Dufour in 1857, the species is endemic to France and Spain.

References

Tapinoma
Hymenoptera of Europe
Insects described in 1857